Hafdís Renötudóttir (born 12 July 1997) is an Icelandic professional handball player and a member of the Icelandic national team.

Career
Hafdís came up through the junior ranks of Fram but moved to Stjarnan in 2016. She won the Icelandic Cup in 2017 with Stjarnan, where she had 16 saves in the finals game against her former team, Fram.

In 2017 she signed with SønderjyskE Håndbold of the Danish Women's Handball League.

In February 2018, she agreed to sign with Norwegian club Sola HK for the upcoming 2018-2019 Eliteserien season.

On 4 September 2019, Hafdís signed a 2-year contract with Fram. She won the Icelandic Cup with the team and was named the Goalkeeper of the Year.

After not playing at the start of the 2020-21 season due to a concussion, Hafdís signed with Swedish club Lugi HF in October 2020. After a two weeks with the team, she suffered her third concussion
in four months and as a result was contemplating retiring from handball.

Referencer

External links
Profile at soenderjyske.dk

1997 births
Living people
Hafdis Renotudottir
Hafdis Renotudottir
Hafdis Renotudottir
21st-century Icelandic women